Omiodes simialis is a moth in the family Crambidae. It was described by Achille Guenée in 1854. It is found in Brazil, Venezuela, French Guiana, the West Indies (Cuba, Puerto Rico, Hispaniola), Honduras, Costa Rica and Florida.

The wingspan is about 31 mm. Adults are on wing in March, May, August and from October to December in Florida.

The larvae feed on Dalbergia ecastophyllum.

References

Moths described in 1854
simialis